Monica Lewis (born May Lewis; May 5, 1922 – June 12, 2015) was an American jazz singer and film actress. Lewis was the longtime voice of Chiquita Banana in that company's animated ad campaign, beginning in 1947.

Biography

Early life
Lewis was born in Chicago, Illinois, United States on May 22, 1922, the youngest of three children. Her father, Leon, was a pianist, musical director for CBS, and composer while her mother, Jessica, was a singer with the Chicago Opera Company, with Lewis studying voice with her mother. When Lewis was 11, she and her family moved to New York City due to The Great Depression.

Career
Lewis began singing on radio after a successful audition with WMCA in New York City led to her own program. While studying at Hunter College at the age of seventeen, she started working as a singer for a radio show called Gloom Dodgers in order to support her family. Shortly after working for Gloom Dodgers, Lewis had a radio show titled Monica Makes Music. She went on to co-star on The Chesterfield Supper Club on radio.

She won a part as a singing cigarette girl in the Broadway show Johnny 2X4. Lewis' work on Broadway led to performing at the Stork Club and leaving school; she changed her name from May to Monica because she thought it was "sexier", telling The New York Times that "I feel much more like Monica and I look much more like Monica, too".

In 1943, jazz pianist Leonard Feather told Lewis that bandleader Benny Goodman needed a singer since Peggy Lee had left upon marrying his band's guitarist, Dave Barbour. At an audition in Times Square with hundreds of women participating, Lewis earned the part as a singer and began to sing on Hotel Astor's roof with Goodman's orchestra. With the help of Goodman she began to establish her career through nationally broadcast shows such as The Revere Camera Show and Beat the Band. Lewis was dubbed "America’s Singing Sweetheart" during this time. She recorded for Signature Records, MGM Records, Decca Records, Capitol Records, and Verve Records. Some of her songs included "Put the Blame on Mame", "I Wish You Love", and "Autumn Leaves." However, Lewis' parents did not allow her to perform in out-of-town tours.

For a short time, Lewis participated in advertisements for companies such as Burlington Mills and Camel cigarettes.

In 1947, Lewis began to provide the singing voice for "Miss Chiquita Banana", a cartoon television commercial character. In 1948 she appeared in the first ever Ed Sullivan Show, then called Toast of the Town, which also featured Richard Rodgers and Oscar Hammerstein II, and Dean Martin and Jerry Lewis].  It was created and produced by her brother Marlo Lewis.

In 1950, she was signed to a contract with MGM. Some of her films included The Strip, Everything I Have Is Yours, and Affair with a Stranger, ‘ ‘The D.I’’, and she later appeared in some 1970s disaster films such as Earthquake (1974), Rollercoaster (1977), and both Airport '77 (1977) and The Concorde ... Airport '79 (1979).

She also from the 1950s to the 1980s made appearances in several television action series, including Those Whiting Girls, Peter Gunn, Johnny Staccato, Wagon Train, The Virginian, Tales of Wells Fargo, and Ironside.

She resumed her singing career in the 1980's and 90's, performing at such popular clubs as the Vine St. Bar and Grill and The Hollywood Roosevelt Cinegrill in Los Angeles and Danny's Skylight Room in New York City.

She spoke about her career just 10 days before her death to The New Yorker magazine, in an article published in the September 7, 2015 edition

Personal life
Lewis was married twice. Her first husband was the American record producer Bob Thiele, with whom she started Signature Records. They married in 1945 but divorced a couple of years later. She moved to Beverly Hills, California in the 1950s. In 1956, she married film producer Jennings Lang and they remained together until his death in 1996. They had three children. Her sister Barbara was a pianist and her brother Marlo worked as a television producer.

In her 2011 memoir Hollywood Through My Eyes, Lewis revealed that actor (and future U.S. President) Ronald Reagan had proposed to her. However, Lewis declined Reagan's marriage proposal.

Monica Lewis died of natural causes at the age of 93 on June 12, 2015 at her home in Woodland Hills, California.

Filmography

Bibliography

References

External links
 
 

1922 births
2015 deaths
American film actresses
Actresses from Chicago
Metro-Goldwyn-Mayer contract players
Singers from Chicago
20th-century American actresses
20th-century American singers
20th-century American women singers
21st-century American women